Curtis Philip Berry (c. 1786 - 1837-40) was the owner of the Trinity estate in Manchester Parish, Jamaica, and a slave-owner. He was an architect by profession and also served as a magistrate. He was elected to the House of Assembly of Jamaica in 1820.

It was claimed by The Christian Observer that he branded his initials C.P.B. on the shoulders and breast of one of his slaves.

References 

1780s births
19th-century deaths
Members of the House of Assembly of Jamaica
Magistrates of Jamaica
19th-century English landowners
British slave owners
19th-century English architects
Year of birth uncertain
Year of death uncertain